The Op. 24 mazurkas by Frédéric Chopin were published in 1836, when the composer was 26 years old.

Mazurka in G minor, Op. 24 No. 1 
The first mazurka of the Op. 24 set is in G minor with a tempo marking of Lento. The piece soon modulates to the relative major key (B-flat major) which soon shifts to a closely related key, E-flat major.

Mazurka in C major, Op. 24 No. 2 
The second mazurka of the set is in C major with a tempo marking of Allegro non troppo, opening with a quiet alternation of C and G major sotto voce chords.  The trio is in D-flat major. The trio is closed by using repeated notes, generally open fifths. The piece is also notable for its vague yet distinctly diatonic harmony, as the opening 56 bars of the piece do not feature a single accidental.

Mazurka in A-flat major, Op. 24 No. 3 
The third mazurka of the set is in A-flat major, with a tempo marking of Moderato non Troppo.

Mazurka in B-flat minor, Op. 24 No. 4 
The fourth mazurka of the set is in B-flat minor, ending on the dominant note (F) alone.

References

External links 
 Page for Op. 24 No. 1 at NIFC
 Page for Op. 24 No. 2 at NIFC
 Page for Op. 24 No. 3 at NIFC
 Page for Op. 24 No. 4 at NIFC

1836 compositions
Mazurkas by Frédéric Chopin
Music with dedications